The 2022 UCI World Tour was a series of races that included thirty-one road cycling events throughout the 2022 cycling season. The tour started with the UAE Tour on 20 February, and concluded with the Il Lombardia on 8 October.

Events
The 2022 calendar was announced in the autumn of 2021.

Cancelled events
Due to COVID-19-related logistical concerns raised by teams regarding travel to Australia (including strict quarantine requirements), the Tour Down Under (18–23 January) and the Cadel Evans Great Ocean Road Race (30 January) were cancelled. On 8 June 2022, the Benelux Tour (29 August – 4 September) was cancelled due to a pressurised calendar. On 17 June 2022, the Tour of Guangxi (13–18 October) was also cancelled due to travel restrictions caused by the COVID-19 pandemic.

Notes

References

External links

 
2022
2022 in men's road cycling